Jim St. Andre is a retired U.S. soccer goalkeeper.  He played professionally in the American Professional Soccer League, National Professional Soccer League and Major League Soccer.

College
St. Andre attended college and played men's soccer at the University of Vermont where over 4 seasons he registered 42 shutouts, 50 wins and a 0.66 career GAA, all school records.  He was named to the All-New England list all four seasons with Vermont and was a 1987 third team All-American.  He led all NCAA Division I goalkeepers in 1989 with a 0.44 GAA.  In 2000, The University of Vermont inducted St Andre into its Athletic Hall of Fame.

Outdoor soccer
After graduating from Vermont, St. Andre trained with Malmö of the Swedish First Division, but was not offered a contract.  When he returned to the U.S., he joined the Colorado Foxes of the American Professional Soccer League (APSL) for the 1990 season.  While with the Foxes, he shared keeper duties with Mark Dodd.  In 1992, they were the top two goalkeepers in the league.  Dodd was tops with a 0.97 GAA and St. Andre second with a 1.22 GAA.  That year the Foxes won the APSL championship, defeating the Tampa Bay Rowdies 1-0 in the title game.  In 1993, St. Andre hit his peak with Colorado when he led the league with a 1.19 GAA.  The team won the championship again, defeating the Los Angeles Salsa 3-1 in overtime.  In 1994, St. Andre began the season with the Foxes, but transferred to the Fort Lauderdale Strikers.  He finished the season with a cumulative 2.17 GAA.  In 1995, St Andre played for the New York Centaurs of the A-League, the APSL with a new name.  Despite playing for the league's worst team, he finished the season third in the league with a 1.43 GAA.

Indoor soccer
St Andre also played several indoor seasons.   In 1991, he joined the Milwaukee Wave of the National Professional Soccer League (NPSL).  That year the Wave failed to make the playoffs and St Andre had a league-worst GAA of 12.48.  He then spent the 1992-1993 season with the Denver Avalanche.  On March 8, 1995, the Wichita Wings signed him.

Major League Soccer
When Major League Soccer began preparations for its first season, it allocated various known players to each of the league's new teams.  On February 5, 1996, MLS allocated St Andre to the Revolution.  St Andre played only 15 games for the Revs, attaining a 1.81 GAA, putting  him 10th out of 13 keepers in MLS that year.  He won 6 games and had 2 shutouts.  Fellow Revs keeper Aidan Heaney, on the other hand ranked 7th in the league with a 1.70 GAA in 19 games (8 wins and 4 shutouts).  The Revs waived St. Andre on November 7, 1996.  
St Andre played for the U.S. National Beach Soccer Team.

Media work
After retiring from playing professionally, St Andre joined ESPN as a studio commentator for the 1998 FIFA World Cup.  He has also provided color commentary for Fox Sports and ESPN.

References

External links
 University of Vermont Athletic Records

1968 births
Living people
American soccer players
American sports announcers
Association football goalkeepers
American Professional Soccer League players
Colorado Foxes players
Denver Avalanche players
Association football commentators
Fort Lauderdale Strikers (1988–1994) players
New York Centaurs players
New York Fever players
Major League Soccer players
New England Revolution players
National Professional Soccer League (1984–2001) players
Milwaukee Wave players
Wichita Wings (NPSL) players
Vermont Catamounts men's soccer players